Liam John Agnew (born 11 April 1995) is an English professional footballer who currently plays as a midfielder for Blyth Spartans.

Agnew started his career with Sunderland, progressing through the club's academy and having a period on loan with Boston United in the Conference North in early 2014. He made one first-team appearance for Sunderland in February 2015, against Fulham in the FA Cup. Agnew was released by Sunderland in 2016, and had a short period back at Boston United before signing for National League North club Harrogate Town in 2017. He was part of the team promoted to the National League in 2018. He played on loan at York City in the National League North from December 2018 to January 2019.

Career

Sunderland
Agnew was born in Sunderland, Tyne and Wear. He started his career in Sunderland's Youth Academy. Agnew joined Conference North club Boston United on 10 January 2014 on loan with the team missing players through injury and suspension. He made his debut the next day, starting in a 4–2 away defeat to Hednesford Town. After extending his loan at Boston, Agnew scored in his second meeting against Hednesford on 1 March 2014, in a 4–0 win. After making 18 appearances and scoring 2 goals for Boston, Agnew returned to his parent club in May 2014.

Agnew signed his first professional contract at Sunderland in March 2014, of two years, contracting him to the club until June 2016. Whilst on loan at Boston, Agnew graduated to the first team-squad at Sunderland, and although he appeared as an unused substitute, this did not affect his loan at Boston. He made his debut for Sunderland on 4 February 2015, appearing as an 87th-minute substitute in a 3–1 FA Cup victory away to Fulham. Whilst in the reserve team, Agnew captained the under-21s. At the end of the 2015–16 season, Agnew was released by the club.

Boston United
Agnew signed for Boston United of the National League North in September 2016. He was expecting to join League One club Bradford City, having impressed manager Phil Parkinson on trial. However, the transfer did not happen, as Parkinson stated he remained unsure of offering Agnew a contract.

Agnew made his second Boston debut on 3 September 2016, where he scored again, in a 3–2 loss against F.C. United of Manchester. Since then, he became the club's captain. Agnew suggested that his non-contract agreement with Boston was close to being replaced by a permanent contract, which came after Lincoln City manager Danny Cowley denied rumours that he was interested in signing Agnew. The club's manager Dennis Greene was confident of Agnew signing a contract. He suffered a foot injury in October and missed the rest of the year.

Harrogate Town
Agnew signed for Boston's National League North rivals Harrogate Town on 26 January 2017. Having been an unused substitute on 4 February against his former club Boston, he made his debut on 11 February, coming on as an 81st-minute substitute in a 3–0 home win over Worcester City. He came on as a 90th-minute substitute on 13 May 2018 when Harrogate beat Brackley Town 3–0 at Wetherby Road in the National League North play-off final, which resulted in the club being promoted to the National League for the first time.

Agnew played regularly for Harrogate in the first few months of the 2018–19 season and signed a new contract with the club in October 2018, with manager Simon Weaver stating that his "performances have gone to another level recently". He re-joined National League North club Boston United on 23 November 2018 on a one-month loan, making his debut the following day when starting their 5–0 away win over Ashton United in the FA Trophy. He played regularly for Boston, although the club's attempts to extend his loan were unsuccessful. He joined another National League North club, York City, on 26 December on a one-month loan, making his debut the same day as a half-time substitute in a 5–1 defeat away to Darlington. He returned to Harrogate on 23 January 2019 having made five appearances for York.

Career statistics

Honours
Harrogate Town
National League North play-offs: 2018

References

External links
Profile at the Harrogate Town A.F.C. website

1995 births
Living people
Footballers from Sunderland
English footballers
Association football midfielders
Sunderland A.F.C. players
Boston United F.C. players
Harrogate Town A.F.C. players
York City F.C. players
National League (English football) players